Ivan Tomašević (10 March 1897 – 31 August 1988) was a notable New Zealand labourer and political activist. He was born in Košarni Do, a village near Orebić, Croatia in 1897.

References

1897 births
1988 deaths
People from Orebić
Croatian emigrants to New Zealand
New Zealand people of Croatian descent
People from the Auckland Region
New Zealand activists